Lake Kubenskoye is a large and shallow lake in Vologda Oblast of Russia, situated at the height of 110.1 metres above mean sea level, stretching for 54 km from north-west to south-east.

The lake is known for its frequents storms and seasonal fluctuations of water level. The lake is elongated from the northwest to the southeast. It is the source of the river Sukhona, which flows out in the southeastern corner of the lake.

Administratively, the lake is divided between Vologodsky District (west), Sokolsky District (southeast), and Ust-Kubinsky District (east) of Vologda Oblast. In terms of the area, Lake Kubenskoye is the fourth natural lake of Vologda Oblast (behind Lake Onega, Lake Beloye, and Lake Vozhe) and the fifth lake (also behind the Rybinsk Reservoir).

The basin occupies much of the central and northern parts of Vologda Oblast, as well as parts of Konoshsky District of Arkhangelsk Oblast. The major tributary of the lake is the Kubena.

History 
The lake was settled by Russians in the 12th century, when the Kamenny Monastery was founded on an islet in the lake. One branch of the Princes of Yaroslavl owned lands in the vicinity and was known as Princes Kubensky. Since 1828, the lake has been part of the Volga-Northern Dvina canal system. The eastern terminus of the Northern Dvina Canal is at the northwestern end of the lake. In 1917, a dam was built at the outflow of the Sukhona, thus converting the lake into a reservoir.

References 

Lakes of Vologda Oblast
LKubenskoye